Live in Japan is a 1973 live album by the American jazz singer Sarah Vaughan, recorded at the Nakano Sun Plaza Hall in Tokyo, Japan.

The two volumes were released separately. A double compact disc set was issued in 1993. In 2006, the United States Library of Congress honored the album by adding it to the National Recording Registry.

Reception and significance
The album was praised in the original LP sleeve-notes by jazz critic Nat Hentoff: "There is Sarah's striking sense of design. The basic framework of each song is carefully structured and personalised, and that makes her frequently stunning improvisations ... all the more absorbing. ... Hers is so resonant and rich a sound you feel you can almost touch it ... in sum a nonpareil illustration of a master singer at the peak of her expressive energies."

The Billboard magazine review from December 15, 1973, commented that "Sarah's virtuosity is something constant...she is superb is gliding, floating, soaring, caressing each word, each note, breaking down words into syllables and extracting the true meaning from each phrase." The review described Vaughan's performance of "Wave" as "a soft, delicate experience in which the scales the vocal spectrum."

In his 2003 book Jazz on Record: The First Sixty Years, critic Scott Yanow described Live in Japan as featuring Vaughan at the "height of her powers" and wrote that "Sassy's voice is often heard in miraculous form on this set."

Track listing
Disc one
"A Foggy Day" (George Gershwin, Ira Gershwin) - 1:21
"Poor Butterfly" (Raymond Hubbell, John Golden) - 5:04
"The Lamp Is Low" (Peter DeRose, Bert Shefter, Mitchell Parish) - 1:37
"'Round Midnight" (Thelonious Monk) - 5:37
"Willow Weep for Me" (Ann Ronnell) - 3:00
"There Will Never Be Another You" (Harry Warren, Mack Gordon) - 1:34
"Misty" (Erroll Garner, Johnny Burke)- 3:12
"Wave" (Antonio Carlos Jobim) - 7:03
"Like Someone in Love" (Jimmy van Heusen, Burke) - 2:29
"My Funny Valentine" (Richard Rodgers, Lorenz Hart) - 5:32
"All of Me" (Gerald Marks, Seymour Simons) - 1:56
"Where Do I Begin" (Francis Lai) - 5:05
"Over the Rainbow" (Harold Arlen, Yip Harburg) - 7:01
"I Could Write a Book" (Richard Rodgers, Lorenz Hart) - 2:15
Disc two
"The Nearness of You" (Hoagy Carmichael, Ned Washington) - 6:58
"I'll Remember April" (Gene de Paul, Don Raye) - 3:33
"Watch What Happens" (Norman Gimbel, Michel Legrand, Jacques Demy) - 3:04
"I Cried for You" (Arthur Freed, Abe Lyman, Gus Arnheim) - 1:33
"Summertime" (George Gershwin, DuBose Heyward) - 4:01
"The Blues" - 7:32
"I Remember You" (Victor Schertzinger, Johnny Mercer) - 5:09
"There Is No Greater Love" (Isham Jones, Marty Syms) - 4:03
"Rainy Days and Mondays" (Paul Williams, Roger Nichols) - 6:11
"On a Clear Day" (Burton Lane, Alan Jay Lerner) - 1:54
"Bye Bye Blackbird" (Ray Henderson, Mort Dixon) - 7:39
"Tonight" (Leonard Bernstein, Stephen Sondheim) - 1:12
"Tenderly" (Walter Gross, Jack Lawrence) - 3:27

Personnel 
 Sarah Vaughan – vocals, piano on "The Nearness of You"
 Carl Shroeder – piano
 John Giannelli – double bass
 Jimmy Cobb – drums

References

1973 live albums
Mainstream Records live albums
Sarah Vaughan live albums
Albums produced by Bob Shad
United States National Recording Registry recordings
Albums recorded at Nakano Sun Plaza
United States National Recording Registry albums